In geometry, the tests for congruence and similarity involve comparing corresponding sides and corresponding angles of polygons. In these tests, each side and each angle in one polygon is paired with a side or angle in the second polygon, taking care to preserve the order of adjacency.

Congruence tests look for all pairs of corresponding sides to be equal in length, though except in the case of the triangle this is not sufficient to establish congruence (as exemplified by a square and a rhombus that have the same side length). Similarity tests look at whether the ratios of the lengths of each pair of corresponding sides are equal, though again this is not sufficient. In either case equality of corresponding angles is also necessary; equality (or proportionality) of corresponding sides combined with equality of corresponding angles is necessary and sufficient for congruence (or similarity).

References

Geometry